Charles Hindley was an 18th-century British Thoroughbred jockey, who won three of the first six runnings of the Derby, the country's most prestigious horse race.  These winners were Young Eclipse (1781), Saltram (1783) and Aimwell (1785).  He also won the 1784 Oaks on Stella and 1792 Oaks on Volante.

Major wins 
 Great Britain
Epsom Derby - (3) - Young Eclipse (1781), Saltram (1783), Aimwell (1785)
Epsom Oaks - (2) - Stella (1784), Volante (1792)

References

Bibliography 
 

British jockeys